Tolquién Airport is an airport serving Achao, a coastal town on Quinchao Island in the Los Lagos Region of Chile.

See also

Transport in Chile
List of airports in Chile

References

External links
OurAirports - Tolquién
FallingRain - Tolquién Airport

Airports in Chile
Airports in Chiloé Archipelago